Cryptoblepharus ahli, also known commonly as Ahl's snake-eyed skink, is a species of lizard in the family Scincidae. The species is endemic to the Island of Mozambique in Mozambique.

Reproduction
C. ahli is oviparous.

References

Further reading
Mertens R (1928). "Neue Inselrassen von Cryptoblepharus boutonii (Desjardins)". Zoologischer Anzeiger 78: 82–89. (Cryptoblepharus boutonii ahli, new subspecies, p. 85). (in German).

Cryptoblepharus
Reptiles described in 1928
Reptiles of Mozambique
Endemic fauna of Mozambique
Taxa named by Robert Mertens